The Return of the Cisco Kid is a 1939 American Western film directed by Herbert I. Leeds and written by Milton Sperling. The film stars Warner Baxter, Lynn Bari, Cesar Romero, Henry Hull, Kane Richmond and C. Henry Gordon. The film was released on April 28, 1939, by 20th Century Fox.

Plot
The Cisco Kid goes on vacation to Arizona, there he finds himself attracted to Ann, notices that she is being manipulated by a businessman due to her grandfather's problems and decides to help them out.

Cast      
 Warner Baxter as The Cisco Kid
 Lynn Bari as Ann Carver
 Cesar Romero as Lopez
 Henry Hull as Colonel Joshua Bixby
 Kane Richmond as Alan Davis
 C. Henry Gordon as Mexican Captain
 Robert Barrat as Sheriff McNally
 Chris-Pin Martin as Gordito
 Adrian Morris as Deputy Johnson
 Soledad Jiménez as Mama Soledad
 Harry Strang as Deputy
 Arthur Aylesworth as Stagecoach Driver
 Paul E. Burns as Hotel Clerk 
 Victor Kilian as Bartender at Stage Stop
 Eddy Waller as Guard on Stagecoach 
 Ruth Gillette as Flora 
 Ward Bond as Accused Rustler
 Ethan Laidlaw as Luke (uncredited)

References

External links 
 
 
 
 

1939 films
20th Century Fox films
American Western (genre) films
1939 Western (genre) films
Films directed by Herbert I. Leeds
Adaptations of works by O. Henry
American black-and-white films
1930s English-language films
1930s American films